The 2012–13 UNC Greensboro Spartans men's basketball team represented University of North Carolina at Greensboro during the 2012–13 NCAA Division I men's basketball season. The Spartans, led by second year head coach Wes Miller, played their home games at the Greensboro Coliseum and were members of the North Division of the Southern Conference. They finish the season 9–22, 6–12 in SoCon play to finish in last place in the North Division. They lost in the quarterfinals of the SoCon tournament to Elon.

Roster

Schedule

|-
!colspan=9| Exhibition

|-
!colspan=9| Regular season

|-
!colspan=9| 2013 Southern Conference men's basketball tournament

References

UNC Greensboro Spartans men's basketball seasons
UNC Greensboro
2012 in sports in North Carolina
2013 in sports in North Carolina